Daily Awam was an Urdu daily newspaper in Pakistan. It was a morning daily published by Jang Group. The Daily Awam Quetta was the third largest circulating newspaper in the whole province of Balochistan, Pakistan which is the largest province (by area) of Pakistan.

It published from Islamabad, Quetta and Hub. The first edition of Daily Awam was published in 1989.

In December 2018, the newspaper ceased publication as the Jang Group laid down the staff of the newspaper for financial reasons.

See also 
 List of newspapers in Pakistan

References

External links
 Awam Official Site

Daily newspapers published in Pakistan
Mass media in Quetta
Newspapers established in 1989
Urdu-language newspapers published in Pakistan
Publications disestablished in 2018
Defunct newspapers published in Pakistan

ur:روزنامہ عوام